The year 1865 in archaeology involved some significant events.

Explorations
 The first report of a discovery of Coţofeni culture at Râpa Roșie in Romania is made by Fr. W. Schuster.

Excavations
Excavations at Slack Roman fort in Yorkshire (England) under the direction of George Lloyd.

Publications
Joseph Barnard Davis and John Thurnam complete publication of Crania Britannica: delineations and descriptions of the skulls of the aboriginal and early inhabitants of the British islands.
John Lubbock publishes Pre-historic Times, as Illustrated by Ancient Remains, and the Manners and Customs of Modern Savages, including his coinage of the term Palæolithic.
Joseph-Alexander Martigny publishes Dictionnaire des antiquités chrétiennes.
Edward Burnett Tylor publishes Researches into the Early History of Mankind and the Development of Civilization.

Finds
French archeologist Auguste Mariette discovers Ti watching a hippopotamus hunt, tomb of Ti, Saqqara, Fifth dynasty of Egypt. It is made c. 2510 BC - 2460 BC.

Events

Churchill Babington elected to the Disney Professorship of Archaeology in the University of Cambridge. 
 Palestine Exploration Fund is established.

Births
 June 22 - Friedrich Sarre, German Orientalist (d. 1945)
 August 27 - James Henry Breasted, American Egyptologist (d. 1935)
 Alfred Foucher, French scholar and archaeologist of Buddhism (d. 1952)

Deaths
 May 4: Henry Christy, English ethnologist, archaeologist and sponsor (born 1810).
 May 21 - Christian Jürgensen Thomsen, Danish archaeologist (born 1788).

See also
Ancient Egypt / Egyptology

References

Archaeology
Archaeology by year
Archaeology
Archaeology